The Legend of King Naresuan: The Series - Damage War or The Legend of King Naresuan: The Series - Ban Sraket Battle is the final season of the MONO29 Thai historical action series The Legend of King Naresuan: The Series. Season 3 focuses on Prince Naresuan during the battle at Ban Srakest between King Naresuan and Nawrahta Minsaw and the beginning of Nanda Bayin's War is based on the King Naresuan 3, 4 film.

Cast and characters

Main cast
Daweerit Chullasapya as Prince Naresuan
Pacharawan Vadrukchit as Manechan
Rachan Sharma as Rachamanu (Bunting) - Teenager
Nattarika Faodan as Princess Lerkin
Aungoont Thanasapchroen as Prince Minchit Sra
Raiwin Ratsaminiyomwut as Princess Natshin Medaw
Pacharanamon Nonthapa as Princess Supankulaya
Pattaravadee Laosa as Princess Wilaikalaya
Worachai Hirunlabh as Pra Chaiburi
Athiwat Theeranithitnanth as Pra Srithamorrat

Recurring cast
 Atiwat Snitwong Na Ayutthaya as King Maha Thamaracha
 Kasarb Jumpadib as King Nanda Bayin
 Siraprapha Sukdumrong as Queen Wisutkasat
 Patthamawan Kaomoolkadi as Princess Thep Kasattri
 Krilash Kreangkrai as Pra Sunthornsongkram
 Nussara Prawanna as Queen Meng Pyu
 Tanayonng Wongtrakul as Lord Luckwaitummoo
 Rattanaballang Tohssawat as Prince Sri Suriyobhan

Production
One of the most notable scenes is the battle between King Naresuan and Nawrahta Minsaw. In this scene, many actors portray soldiers. Pitchawut Piemthammaroj (Prince Ekathotsarot) did not appear in this scene because he was taking an exam to become an attorney. The director looked for a substitute actor to fill the role but was unable to find one.

References

External links 
 

2018 Thai television seasons